The first season of the American television sitcom New Girl premiered on Fox on September 20, 2011, and concluded on May 8, 2012, consisting of 24 episodes. Developed by Elizabeth Meriwether under the working title Chicks & Dicks, the series revolves around offbeat teacher Jess (Zooey Deschanel) after she moves into a Los Angeles loft with three single men, Nick (Jake Johnson), Schmidt (Max Greenfield), and Winston (Lamorne Morris). Jess's best friend Cece (Hannah Simone) also appears regularly. The show combines comedy and drama elements as the characters, who are around 30 years old, deal with relationships and career choices.

Cast and characters

Main cast
 Zooey Deschanel as Jessica "Jess" Day
 Jake Johnson as Nick Miller
 Max Greenfield as Schmidt
 Damon Wayans, Jr. as Coach
 Lamorne Morris as Winston Bishop
 Hannah Simone as CeCe

Recurring cast

 Mary Elizabeth Ellis as Caroline
 Justin Long as Paul
 Michaela Watkins as Gina
 Gillian Vigman as Kim
 Rachael Harris as Tanya Lamontagne
 Lizzy Caplan as Julia
 Kali Hawk as Shelby
 Dermot Mulroney as Russell
 Phil Hendrie as Joe Napoli
 Rebecca Reid as Nadia

Guest cast
 Natasha Lyonne as Gretchen 
 Katie Cassidy as Brooke 
 Lake Bell as Amanda 
 Eva Amurri as Beth 
 Stephen Amell as Kyle 
 Jeff Kober as Remy 
 Clark Duke as Cliff 
 Ryan Kwanten as Oliver 
 Joey King as Brianna 
 June Diane Raphael as Sadie  
 Martin Starr as Dirk 
 Katrina Bowden as Holly 
 Jazz Raycole as Miriam 
 Kareem Abdul-Jabbar as himself 
 Jeanne Tripplehorn as Ouli 
 Thomas Lennon as Neil

Episodes

Reception
On the review aggregator website Rotten Tomatoes, the season holds an approval rating of 84% based on 32 reviews, with an average rating of 6.83/10.
The site's critical consensus reads, "Zooey Deschanel's offbeat style gets a worthy showcase in New Girl, and while it can get awfully cutesy at times, the show benefits from witty writing and a strong supporting cast." Metacritic, which uses a weighted average, assigned the season a score of 66 out of 100 based on 25 critics, indicating "generally favorable reviews".

Home media release
Fox Home Entertainment released season 1 on DVD in region 1 on October 2, 2012 a week after the second season premiere. The three disc set includes deleted & extended scenes, audio commentary for three episodes, a gag reel, three featurettes and alternate jokes. A sneak peek to Ben and Kate is also included in the DVD.

Notes

References

External links

 
 

New Girl
2011 American television seasons
2012 American television seasons